Andronikos Doukas Palaiologos (– ) was a Byzantine aristocrat and governor of Thessalonica early in the 12th century.

Life 
His father was the son of the first known member of the Palaiologos line, became a distinguished general and was among the most important supporters of Emperor Alexios I Komnenos, while his mother was the sister of Alexios' empress-consort, Irene Doukaina. Andronikos himself was named after his maternal grandfather Andronikos Doukas, which according to Byzantine custom probably suggests that he was the second-born son (his older brother Nikephoros bearing the paternal grandfather's name); Andronikos seems also to have preferred his mother's surname of Doukas, by which he is referred to in the sources.

Like his father, he held the court dignity of sebastos, but his early life is obscure. P. Gautier suggested that he is to be identified with the logothetes ton sekreton Andronikos Doukas, active under Alexios I, possibly after 1109. The only definitive information about his career is that he served as governor of Thessalonica. The Timarion, a satirical dialogue placed in the city, alludes to him without naming him, while an act preserved in the Docheiariou monastery records the "pansebastos sebastos Andronikos Doukas" serving as "doux and praetor" of Thessalonica in January/February 1112.

Andronikos died young of heart failure, predeceasing his parents. His death is placed . According to Demetrios Polemis, he was survived by his wife—Polemis surmises that this was a daughter of the porphyrogennete princess Zoe Doukaina, youngest daughter of Constantine X Doukas and wife of Adrianos Komnenos—and was possibly the father of the megas hetaireiarches George Palaiologos (who may alternatively have been his brother), but Jean-Claude Cheynet and Jean-François Vannier believe that he had no offspring. The court poet Nicholas Kallikles wrote an epitaph and four other poems in his honour,  and his parents were later buried in the same tomb following their death.

References

Sources
 

1180s births
1110s deaths
12th-century Byzantine people
Byzantine governors of Thessalonica
Andronikos
Officials of Alexios I Komnenos